Damalops is an extinct genus of Alcelaphinae. It lived during the Pliocene and Pleistocene in southern Asia, where the species Damalops palaeindicus is known from the Siwaliks in the northern part of the Indian Subcontinent.

References

Alcelaphinae
Prehistoric bovids
Pliocene even-toed ungulates
Pleistocene even-toed ungulates
Pliocene first appearances
Pleistocene genus extinctions
Cenozoic mammals of Asia
Prehistoric even-toed ungulate genera